James M. Freeman (born 1936) is an American anthropologist, and professor at San Jose State University.

Life
He graduated from Northwestern University, Harvard University with an MA, and a Ph.D. in Social Relations in 1968.

Awards
 1998-2001 Alfred P. Sloan Foundation grant
 1998-2000 National Science Foundation grant.
 1990 American Book Award, for Hearts of Sorrow: Vietnamese-American Lives
 1983 - 1984 National Endowment for the Humanities Fellowship.
 1983 National Endowment for the Humanities Summer Stipend.

Works

References

External links

Archival collections

Guide to the James Freeman Files. Special Collections and Archives, The UC Irvine Libraries, Irvine, California.

1936 births
American anthropologists
San Jose State University faculty
Northwestern University alumni
Harvard Graduate School of Arts and Sciences alumni
Living people
American Book Award winners